Alexander Otto (born 28 January 1988) is a German former professional footballer who played as a right-back.

References

External links 
 

1988 births
Living people
People from Chüy Region
Citizens of Germany through descent
German people of Kyrgyzstani descent
German footballers
Association football defenders
3. Liga players
1. FC Saarbrücken players
SV Röchling Völklingen players